Vangelis Vlachos (born 6 January 1962) is a Greek former professional footballer who played as a midfielder. He is the manager of AE Mykonos

Club career
Vlachos started his career from the academies of AEK Athens. In 1979 he was promoted to the first team alongside Stelios Manolas and Lysandros Georgamlis. On 26 December 1979, at the age of 17 years and 242 days, he became the then youngest scorer of AEK in the league when he scored 2 goals in a match against Kavala. He formed an excellent partnership with Thomas Mavros, while they were also friends off-field. From 1982 he became the club's captain. Vlachos had a big part in winning the cup in 1983, scoring a very beautiful goal with an individual effort in the final against PAOK. He became at that time the youngest team captain to lift the Greek Cup.

In 1985, Vlachos was at the end of his five year contract and the president of AEK, Zafiropoulos proposed a relatively small offer for a contract renewal. Vlachos had also an offer from Vardinogiannis, to move to Panathinaikos, which he accepted. At 26 April 1985, he filed an appeal to EEODEP, asking for debts from AEK and making use of his five-year term, asked to be released from the club so he could play for Panathinaikos. It was the beginning of a court series that lasted several months, which resulted in Vlachos playing for Panathinaikos, but after his contract with AEK expired in December 1985. He remained at Panathinaikos until 1991, where he won 3 championships, 4 cups and 1 Super Cup. He then played for one season at Korinthos, where he ended his professional career relatively early, in 1992.

International career
Vlachos also competed 4 times with Greece from 1982 to 1987.

Managerial career
Vlachos started his coaching career from AE Vouliagmenis in 1993. In 1994 he was the manager of Panathinaikos U20, where he was promoted the following season as the assistant manager of the men's team. In 1999 he coached Kavala until December and then Skoda Xanthi, where he remained for a season. In 2000 he took over as coach of Panachaiki and in 2001 of Apollo Kalamarias. In 2002 he had a brief spell at Fostiras and in the same season he continued in Kallithea. In 2003 he took over Ionikos, from which he left in 2005, to continue in OFI, while in 2006 he had a short spell at Panionios and after the end of his term there, he retired for three years due to family obligations.

He returned to coaching in October 2009 with Asteras Tripolis, where he remained until the middle of January 2011. After one and a half season, he took over the financially ruined AEK Athens in 2012, with Mavros as president in an effort to keep the club in the category. He was sacked after four months at the club.

In January 2015, he was announced by AEL Kalloni, where he stayed for a brief period. In June 2022 he was hired by AE Mykonos.

Honours

AEK Athens 
Greek Cup: 1982–83

Panathinaikos
Alpha Ethniki: 1985–86, 1989–90, 1990–91
Greek Cup: 1985–86, 1987–88, 1985–89, 1990–91
Greek Super Cup: 1988

References

External links

1962 births
Living people
Greek footballers
Greece international footballers
Association football midfielders
AEK Athens F.C. players
AEK F.C. non-playing staff
Panathinaikos F.C. players
Korinthos F.C. players
Greek football managers
Xanthi F.C. managers
Panachaiki F.C. managers
AEK Athens F.C. managers
Ionikos F.C. managers
People from Euboea (regional unit)
Footballers from Central Greece